Heteralcis is a genus of moths in the family Lecithoceridae. The genus was erected by Edward Meyrick in 1925.

Species
 Heteralcis bathroptila (Meyrick, 1929)
 Heteralcis clavata (Park, 2001)
 Heteralcis holocona (Meyrick, 1908)
 Heteralcis isochra (Meyrick, 1908)
 Heteralcis molybdantha (Meyrick, 1908)
 Heteralcis palathodes (Meyrick, 1906)
 Heteralcis platycapna (Meyrick, 1916)
 Heteralcis rhizophora (Meyrick, 1919)
 Heteralcis tetraclina (Meyrick, 1906)

References

 
Lecithocerinae
Moth genera